Marcos Antônio Pereira (born 4 April 1972 in Linhares) is a Brazilian lawyer and discharged bishop of the Universal Church of the Kingdom of God and politician. Is the current president of the Republicans, and former minister of Industry, Foreign Trade and Services, appointed by president Michel Temer. Resigned from the office as minister on 3 January 2018 to deal with "personal and partisan affairs".

References

|-

|-

|-

|-

1972 births
People from Linhares
Mackenzie Presbyterian University alumni
Republicans (Brazil) politicians
Members of the Universal Church of the Kingdom of God
Brazilian Pentecostal pastors
Living people
Brazilian anti-abortion activists